The Principality or, from 1253, Kingdom of Galicia–Volhynia, historically known as the Kingdom of Ruthenia, was a medieval state in Eastern Europe which existed from 1199 to 1349. Its territory was predominantly located in modern-day Ukraine, with parts in Belarus, Poland, Moldova, and Lithuania. Along with Novgorod and Vladimir-Suzdal, it was one of the three most important powers to emerge from the collapse of Kievan Rus'. The main language was Old East Slavic, the predecessor of the modern East Slavic languages, and the official religion was Eastern Orthodoxy.

Roman the Great united the principalities of Halych and Volhynia at the turn of the 13th century. Following the destruction wreaked by the Mongol invasion of Kievan Rus' (1239 to 1241), Prince Daniel of Galicia and other princes of Rus pledged allegiance to Batu Khan of the Golden Horde in 1246. The Polish conquest of the kingdom in 1349 led to it being fully absorbed by Catholic Poland. Upon annexing it, Polish king Casimir III the Great adopted the title of King of Poland and Ruthenia, and the territory was transformed into the Ruthenian Voivodeship in 1434.

Geographically, western Galicia–Volhynia extended between the rivers San and Wieprz in what is now south-eastern Poland, while its eastern territories covered the Pripet Marshes (now in Belarus) and the upper reaches of the Southern Bug river in modern-day Ukraine. During its time, the kingdom was bordered by Black Rus, the Grand Duchy of Lithuania, the Principality of Turov-Pinsk, the Principality of Kiev, the Golden Horde, the Kingdom of Hungary, the Kingdom of Poland, Moldavia and the Monastic State of the Teutonic Knights.

History

Tribal period 
After the fall of the Roman Empire, the area was populated by East Slavic people, such as the Buzhans, Dulebes, and White Croats. The southwestern edge of the land was probably part of the Great Moravian state. In 907, White Croats and Dulebs were involved in the military campaign against Constantinople led by Rus' Prince Oleg of Novgorod. This is the first significant evidence of the political affiliation of native tribes. The area was mentioned in 981 (by Nestor), when Vladimir the Great of Kievan Rus' took over on his way into Poland. He founded the city of Volodymyr and later Christianized the locals.

In the 12th century, the Principality of Halych was formed there by descendants of Vladimir the Great. It merged at the end of the 12th century with the neighboring Principality of Volhynia into the principality of Galicia–Volhynia, which existed with some breaks for a century and a half.

Reign of Roman the Great (1199–1205) 
Volhynia and Galicia had originally been two separate principalities, assigned on a rotating basis to younger members of the Kievan dynasty. The line of Prince Roman the Great of Volodymyr had held the principality of Volhynia, while the line of Yaroslav Osmomysl held the Principality of Halych (later adopted as Galicia). Galicia–Volhynia was created following the death in 1198 or 1199 (and without a recognized heir in the paternal line) of the last Prince of Galicia, Vladimir II Yaroslavich; Roman acquired the Principality of Galicia and united his lands into one state. He did so upon the invitation of the boyars of Galician boyars, who expected that Roman would be an "absentee" Volhynian prince ruling from afar, so that they could increase their own power. On the contrary, Roman curbed their power, expelled any boyar who opposed him, and increased the influence of the urban and rural populace.

In Roman's time Galicia–Volhynia's principal cities were Halych and Volodymyr. Roman was allied with Poland, signed a peace treaty with Hungary and developed diplomatic relations with the Byzantine Empire. The Grand Prince of Kyiv Rurik Rostislavich (Rurik II) forged a coalition of Rus' princes and attacked Galicia-Volhynia, but Roman defeated them and captured Kyiv in 1200. However, because the old capital of Kyivan Rus' was no longer a strong power centre by that time, Roman kept the prosperous Halych as his capital and appointed subordinates to administer Kyiv in his name. He then mounted two successful campaigns against the Cumans, in 1201–2 and 1203–4. In 1203 Roman also extended his rule to the Principality of Pereyaslavl. During his absence, Rurik II retook and heavily sacked Kyiv in 1203 with the help of Polovtsians and Chernihivians. In 1204 Roman recaptured Kyiv once more, marking the height of his reign: he briefly became the most powerful of the Rus' princes. He married the niece of the Byzantine emperor Alexios III, for whom Galicia was the main military ally against the Cumans. The relation with Byzantium helped to stabilize Galicia's relations with the Rus' population of the Lower Dniester and the Lower Danube.

War of succession (1205–1245) 

In 1205, Roman's alliance with the Poles broke down, leading to a conflict with Leszek the White and Konrad of Masovia. Roman was subsequently killed by Polish forces in the Battle of Zawichost (1205), triggering a war of succession, while his dominion entered a period of rebellion and chaos that lasted almost 40 years. In this time, the Galician boyars made efforts to prevent the establishment of a hereditary princely dynasty, especially by Roman's son Danylo, and instead put all sorts of puppets on the throne which they could easily control. Thus weakened by war between Galician boyars and some appanage princes, Galicia–Volhynia also became an arena of rivalry between Poland and Hungary, which intervened in the region several times. Roman's successors would mostly use Halych (Galicia) as the designation of their combined kingdom. King Andrew II of Hungary styled himself , Latin for "king of Galicia and Vladimir [in-Volhynia]", a title that was later adopted by the House of Habsburg. 

After Roman's death, the Galician boyars first drove Roman's widow Anna-Euphrosyne and two sons Danylo and Vasylko from the region. From 1206 to 1212, the Principality of Galicia was controlled by the three sons of the Novhorod-Siverskyian prince Ihor Svyatoslavych: Volodymyr Ihorevych, Svyatoslav Ihorevych, and Roman Ihorevych. They were defeated by Galician boyars, and the boyar  assumed the throne of Halych in 1213 or 1214, the only non-Rurikid ever to rule any of the Rus' principalities. After he was removed, a compromise agreement was concluded in 1214 between Hungary and Poland, who partitioned the Galician lands. The throne of Galicia–Volhynia was given to Andrew's son, Coloman of Lodomeria, who had married Leszek the White's daughter, Salomea.

In 1221, Mstyslav Mstyslavich the Able, son of Mstislav Rostislavich (descendant of the princes of Novgorod), liberated Galicia–Volhynia from the Hungarians and Poles. During Mstyslav's 1221–1128 reign, the Galician and Volhynian armies participated in the Battle of the Kalka River (1223) against the Mongols, but in 1228 the boyars expelled him and transferred the Principality of Galicia to the king of Hungary. It was Danylo Romanovych (also known as Daniel of Galicia, or Danylo Halytskyi), son of Roman, who formed a real union of Volhynia and Galicia. Danylo first established himself in Volhynia. After failing to retake his father's other throne in 1230–1232 and 1233–1235, Danylo succeeded upon his third attempt and conquered Halych in 1238, reunited Galician and Volhynia, and ruled for a quarter century. Danylo captured Kyiv in 1239,
just before the Mongols besieged, conquered and sacked the city in late 1240. The brothers also crushed their ally Rostislav Mikhailovich, son of the prince of Chernihiv.

Reign of Danylo (1245–1264) 

Danylo strengthened his relations with Batu Khan by traveling to his capital Saray (Sarai) and acknowledging, at least nominally, the supremacy of the Mongol Golden Horde. After meeting with Batu Khan in 1246, Danylo reorganized his army along Mongol lines and equipped it with Mongolian weapons, although Danylo himself maintained the traditional attire of a Rus prince. According to Vernadsky (1970), Danylo's alliance with the Mongols was merely tactical; he pursued a long-term strategy of resistance to the Mongols. On the other hand, Magocsi (2010) argued that Danylo submitted to the Mongols, citing the Galician–Volhynian Chronicle, which decried Danylo 'is now on his knees and is called a slave' and called this event 'the greatest disgrace'. Magocsi stated that, 'although he never acknowledged it', Danylo was a Mongol vassal, who collected the Mongol tribute, and generally helped 'establishing Mongol administrative control over eastern Europe in cooperation with those Rus' princes who could be made to see the advantages of the new Pax Mongolica.' According to Magocsi, Danylo's submission to the Mongols ensured the strength and prosperity of Galicia–Volhynia. He did renew his alliances with Hungary, Poland and Lithuania, making plans to forge an anti-Mongol coalition with them to wage a crusade against the Khan; although these were never carried out, it would eventually lead to Danylo's royal coronation by papal legate in 1253. This brought Galicia–Volhynia into the orbit of the western European feudal order, and the Roman Catholic Church.

In 1245, Pope Innocent IV allowed Danylo to be crowned king. Danylo wanted more than recognition, commenting bitterly that he expected an army when he received the crown. Although Danylo promised to promote recognition of the Pope to his people, his realm continued to be ecclesiastically independent from Rome. Thus, Danylo was the only member of the Rurik dynasty to have been crowned king. Danylo was crowned by the papal legate Opizo de Mezzano in Dorohochyn 1253 as the first King of all Rus' (Rex Russiae; 1253–1264). In 1256 Danylo succeeded in driving the Mongols out of Volhynia, and a year later he defeated their attempts to capture the cities of Lutsk and Volodymyr. Upon the approach of a large army under the Mongolian general Boroldai in 1260, however, Danylo was forced to accept their authority and to raze the fortifications he had built against them.

Under Danylo's reign, the Kingdom of Ruthenia was one of the most powerful states in east central Europe, and it has been described as a 'golden age' for Galicia–Volhynia. Literature flourished, producing the Galician–Volhynian Chronicle. Demographic growth was enhanced by immigration from the west and the south, including Germans and Armenians. Commerce developed due to trade routes linking the Black Sea with Poland, Germany, and the Baltic basin. Major cities, which served as important economic and cultural centers, included Lviv (where the royal seat would later be moved by Danylo's son), Volodymyr, Halych, Kholm (Danylo's capital), Peremyshl, Dorohychyn, and Terebovlya. Galicia–Volhynia was important enough that in 1252 Danylo was able to marry his son Roman to the heiress of the Austrian Duchy in the vain hope of securing it for his family. Another son, Shvarn, married a daughter of Mindaugas, Lithuania's first king, and briefly ruled that land from 1267 to 1269. At the peak of its expansion, the Galician–Volhynian state contained not only south-western Rus lands, including Red Rus and Black Rus, but also briefly controlled the Brodnici on the Black Sea.

Reign of Lev (1264–1301) 
After Danylo's death in 1264, he was succeeded by his son Lev, who moved the capital to Lviv in 1272 and for a time maintained the strength of Kingdom of Rus. Unlike his father, who pursued a Western political course, Lev worked closely with the Mongols, in particular cultivating a close alliance with the Tatar Khan Nogai. Together with his Mongol allies, he invaded Poland. However, although his troops plundered territory as far west as Racibórz, sending many captives and much booty back to Galicia, Lev did not ultimately gain much territory from Poland. Lev also attempted, unsuccessfully, to establish his family's rule over Lithuania. Soon after his brother Shvarn ascended to the Lithuanian throne in 1267, he had the former Lithuanian ruler Vaišvilkas killed. Following Shvarn's loss of the throne in 1269, Lev entered into conflict with Lithuania. From 1274 to 1276 he fought a war with the new Lithuanian ruler Traidenis but was defeated, and Lithuania annexed the territory of Black Ruthenia with its city Navahrudak. In 1279, Lev allied himself with king Wenceslaus II of Bohemia and invaded Poland, although his attempt to capture Kraków in 1280 ended in failure. That same year, Lev defeated Hungary and annexed part of Transcarpathia, including the city of Mukachevo. In 1292, he defeated fragmented Poland and added Lublin with surrounding areas to the territory of Kingdom of Rus.

Decline (1301–1340) 

After Lev's death in 1301, a period of decline ensued. Lev was succeeded by his son Yuri I, who ruled for only seven years. Although his reign was largely peaceful and the Kingdom of Rus flourished economically, Yuri I lost Lublin to the Poles in 1302. From 1308 until 1323 Kingdom of Rus was jointly ruled by Yuri I's sons Andrew and Lev II, who proclaimed themselves to be the kings of Kingdom of Rus. The brothers forged alliances with King Władysław I of Poland and the Teutonic Order against the Lithuanians and the Mongols, but the Kingdom was still tributary to the Mongols and joined the Mongol military expeditions of Uzbeg Khan and his successor, Janibeg Khan. The brothers died together in 1323, in battle, fighting against the Mongols, and left no heirs.

After the extinction of the Rurikid dynasty in Kingdom of Rus in 1323, Volhynia passed into the control of the Lithuanian prince Liubartas, while the boyars took control over Galicia. They invited the Polish prince Boleslaw Yuri II, a grandson of Yuri I, to assume the Galician throne. Boleslaw converted to Orthodoxy and assumed the name Yuri II. Nevertheless, suspecting him of harboring Catholic feelings, the boyars poisoned him in 1340 and elected one of their own, Dmitry Detko, to lead the Galician state. In Winter 1341 Tatars, Ruthenians led by Detko, and Lithuanians led by Liubartas were able to defeat the Poles, although they were not so successful in Summer 1341. Finally, Detko was forced to accept Polish overlordship, as a starost of Halych. After Detko's death, Poland's King Casimir III mounted a successful invasion, capturing and annexing Galicia in 1349. Galicia–Volhynia ceased to exist as an independent state.

Danylo's dynasty attempted to gain support from Pope Benedict XII and broader European powers for an alliance against the Mongols, but ultimately proved unable to compete with the rising powers of the centralised Grand Duchy of Lithuania and the Kingdom of Poland. Only in 1349, after the occupation of Galicia–Volhynia by an allied Polish-Hungarian force, was the Kingdom of Rus finally conquered and incorporated in Poland. This ended the vassalage of Kingdom of Rus to the Golden Horde.

Final years and aftermath (1340–1392) 

From 1340 to 1392, the civil war in the region transitioned into a power struggle between Lithuania, Poland, and Hungary. The first stage of conflict led to the signing of a treaty in 1344 that secured the Principality of Peremyshl for the Crown of Poland, while the rest of the territory belonged to a member of the Gediminis family, Liubartas. Eventually by the mid-14th century, the Kingdom of Poland and the Grand Duchy of Lithuania divided up the region between them: King Casimir III took Galicia and Western Volhynia, while the sister state of Eastern Volhynia together with Kiev came under Lithuanian control, 1352–66.

After 1352 most of the Ruthenian Voivodeship belonged to the Crown of the Polish Kingdom, where it remained also after the Union of Lublin between Poland and Lithuania.

By the treaty of the Union of Lublin of 1569, all of the former principality of Galicia–Volhynia became part of Poland. In 1772, Empress Maria Theresa of Austria (who was also Queen of Hungary) revived the old Hungarian claims to the Kingdom of Galicia and Lodomeria, using them to justify the participation of Austria in the partitions of Poland.

Historical role 

The Galician-Volhynian Chronicle reflected the political programme of the Romanovich dynasty ruling Galicia–Volhynia. Galicia–Volhynia competed with other successor states of Kievan Rus' (notably Vladimir-Suzdal) to claim the Kievan inheritance. According to the Galician–Volhynian Chronicle, Kingdom of Rus King Daniel was the last ruler of Kiev preceding the Mongolian invasion and thus Galicia–Volhynia's rulers were the only legitimate successors to the Kievan throne. Until the end of Galician-Volhynian state, its rulers advanced claims upon "all the land of Rus'." The seal of King Yuri I contained the Latin inscription domini georgi regis rusie.

In contrast to their consistent secular or political claims to the Kievan inheritance, Galicia's rulers were not concerned by religious succession. This differentiated them from their rivals in Vladimir-Suzdal, who sought to, and attained, control over the Kievan Church. Rather than contest Vladimir-Suzdal's dominance of the Kievan Church, Kingdom of Rus' rulers merely asked for and obtained a separate Church from Byzantium.

Galicia–Volhynia also differed from the northern and eastern principalities of the former Kievan Rus' in terms of its relationship with its western neighbors. King Danylo was alternatively an ally or a rival with neighboring Slavic Poland and partially Slavic Hungary. According to historian George Vernadsky (1970), the Kingdom of Rus', Poland and Hungary belonged to the same psychological and cultural world. The Roman Catholic Church was seen as a neighbor and there was much intermarriage between the princely houses of Galicia and those of neighboring Catholic countries. In contrast, the Westerners faced by Alexander, prince of Novgorod, were the Teutonic Knights, and the northeastern Rus experience of the West was that of hostile crusaders rather than peers.

In Ukrainian historiography, the Kingdom of Galicia-Volhynia played an important role, uniting the western and southern branches of East Slavs and consolidating their identity, and becoming a new center of political and economic life after the decline of Kiev.

Administrative structure 

The principality was divided into several appanage duchies and lands:
 Principality of Halych
 Principality of Peremyshl
 Principality of Zvenyhorod
 Principality of Terebovlia
 Principality of Volhynia
 Principality of Lutsk
 Principality of Dorohobuzh
 Principality of Peresopnytsia
 Principality of Belz
 Land of Chełm (Lublin 1289–1302)
 Land of Berestia
 Black Ruthenia, a fief of Grand Duchy of Lithuania after a treaty between Daniel of Galicia and Vaišvilkas

Temporary divisions 
 Principality of Kiev (1230–1240)
 Principality of Turow (1230s)
 Zakarpattia (1280–1320) ???

Rulers

 1199–1205 Roman the Great (in Volhynia since 1197, in Galicia since 1199)
 1205–1214 political crisis
 1205–1206 Euphrosine Angelina (daughter of Isaac II Angelos) as a regent for Danylo/Daniel of Galicia
 1206–1212: the three sons of Ihor Svyatoslavych: Volodymyr Ihorevych, Svyatoslav Ihorevych, and Roman Ihorevych.
 1210 Rostislav II of Kiev (short stint)
 1211–1212 Mstislav the Mute as a regent for Danylo/Daniel of Galicia
 1212–1214 Uprising led by a boyar Volodyslav Kormylchych
 1214–1232 Hungarian occupation, sons of Andrew II of Hungary
 1214–1220 Coloman, son of Andrew (King of Galicia and Lodomeria)
 1220–1221 Uprising led by Mstyslav the Able, who ruled in Halych from 1221 to 1228
 1220–1232 Andrew, son of Andrew
 1232–1235 Danylo/Daniel of Galicia
 1235–1238 children of Michael of Chernigov
 1238–1264 Danylo/Daniel of Galicia
 1264–1269 Dual power descendants of Daniel
 1264–1269 Shvarn
 1264–1301 Lev I of Galicia
 1301–1308 Yuri I of Galicia
 1308–1323 Dual power descendants of Yuri
 1308–1323 Lev II of Galicia
 1308–1323 Andrew of Galicia

 1323–1349 political crisis, de facto ruled by a boyar Dmytro Dedko
 1323–1325 Galicia: , Volhynia: Liubartas
 1325–1340 Yuri II Boleslav (united as compromise)
 1340 takeover of Galicia by Casimir III the Great
 1341–1349 Liubartas
 1349 Galicia annexed (patrimonial) by Poland and Hungary, Volhynia – Lithuania
Notes: The senior branch of Rurikid dynasty, in the 14th century Galician rulers came in close relations with Mazovian Piasts (Duke of Mazovia) and rising Gediminids which established the Grand Duchy of Lithuania.

Gallery

See also
 King of Rus
 Kingdom of Galicia and Lodomeria
 Civil war in Greater Poland (1382–1385)
 List of Ukrainian rulers
 Mongol invasion of Rus
 List of early East Slavic states
 List of rulers of Galicia and Volhynia
 Ruthenian nobility
 Constantinople Metropolitan of Halych

Notes

References

Sources
 
 
 
 
 Litopys.org.ua
 Галицько-Волинський Літопис. Іпатіївський список
 Галицько-Волинський Літопис. Іпатіївський список
 Галицько-Волинський Літопис. Острозький (Хлєбниковський) список
 Галицько-Волинський Літопис. Переклад Л.Махновця
 Литовсько-білоруські літописи
 Список городів руських дальніх і близьких
 Перелік джерел за "Крип'якевич І. Галицько-волинське князівство. Київ, 1984"
 Ілюстрації з "Chronicon Pictum"
 Болеслав-Юрий II, князь всей Малой Руси: Сборник материалов и исследований. — Санкт-Петербург, 1907.

Further reading

Cyrillic
 Андрияшев А. М. Очерки истории Волынской земли до конца XIV ст. Киев, 1887.
 Галицкий исторический сборник, 1854, вып. 2.
 Греков Б. Д. Древнейшие судьбы славянства в Прикарпатских. областях // Вестник АН СССР. 1940. No. 11–12.
 Греков Б. Д. Крестьяне на Руси. — Москва,1952.
 Иванов П. А., Исторические судьбы Волынской земли с древнейших времен до конца XIV века, Одесса, 1895.
 Крип'якевич І. Галицько-волинське князівство. Київ, 1984.
 Коваленко В. Чернігів і Галич у ХІІ — ХІІІ ст. // Галичина та Волинь у добу Середньовіччя. — Львів, 2001. — С.154–165.
 Котляр М. Ф. Данило Галицький. — Київ, 1979.
 Материалы для истории и этнографии края. — Волынския губернския ведомости, 1854.
 Пашуто В. Т., Очерки по истории Галицко-ВольІнской Руси. — Москва, 1950.
 Руссов С. Волынские записки сочинінные Степаном Руссовым в Житомире. — Санкт-Петербург, 1809.
 Шабульдо Ф. М. Земли Юго-Западной Руси в составе Великого княжества Литовского. Киев, "Наукова думка", 1987.

Latin
 Bielowski A. Halickowlodzimierskie księstwo. — Biblioteka Ossolińskich., t. 4.
 Bielowski A. Królewstwo Galicji (o starem księstwie Halickiem). — Biblioteka Ossolińskich, 1860, t. 1
 Gebhard L. A. Geschichte des Konigreiches Galizien, Lodomerien und Rotreussen. — Pest, 1778;
 Engel J. Ch. Geschichte von Halitsch und Vlodimir. — Wien, 1792.
 Harasiewicz M. Berichtigung der Umrisse zu einer Geschichte der Ruthenen. — Wien, 1835.
 Harasiewicz M. Annales ecclesiae Ruthenae. — Leopoli, 1862.
 Hoppe L A. Geschichte des Konigreiches Galizien und Lodomerien. — Wien, 1792.
 Lewicki A. Ruthenische Teilfürstentümer. — In: Österreichische Monarchie im Wort und Bild Galizien. Wien, 1894.
 Siarczyński F. Dzieje księstwa niegdyś Przemyślskiego. — Czasopism naukowy Biblioteki im. Ossolińskich, 1828, N 2/3;
 Siarczyński F. Dzieje niegdyś księstwa Belzkiego i miasta Belza. — Czasopism naukowy Biblioteki im. Ossolińskich, 1829, N 2.
 Stecki J. T. Wołyń pod względem statystycznym, historycznym i archeologicznym. — Lwów, 1864
 Zubrzycki D. Rys do historii narodu ruskiego w Galicji i hierarchii cerkiewnej w temże królewstwie. — Lwów, 1837.
 Zubrzycki D. Kronika miasta Lwowa. — Lwów, 1844.

External links

 Довідник з історії України. За ред. І. Підкови та Р. Шуста. — Київ: Генеза, 1993. 
 Галицько-волинські князі
 Ісаєвич Я. Князь і король Данило та його спадкоємці // Дзеркало тижня. 2001, №48 (372)
 Карта Галицько-Волинського князівства
 Володимир-Волинський у «Галереї мистецтв»
 Борис Яценко, «Слово о полку Ігоревім» та його доба («Slovo o polku Ihorevim» ta joho doba)
 Волинська земля у складі Галицько-Волинського князівства (Volynśka zemľa u skladi Halyćko-Volynśkoho kńazivstva)
 За що боролись (Za ščo borolyś) 

 
12th century in Kievan Rus'
Diarchies
States and territories established in 1199
States and territories disestablished in the 1340s
Medieval Ukraine
13th century in Ukraine
14th century in Ukraine
1349 disestablishments in Europe
History of Red Ruthenia
1199 establishments in Europe
Galicia–Volhynia
Former countries
Vassal and tributary states of the Golden Horde
Former monarchies of Europe